Llorenç Matamala i Piñol (1856–1925) was a Spanish Catalan sculptor.

Matamala was born at Vila de Gràcia, a quarter of Barcelona. He collaborated with sculptor Joan Flotats, with whom he worked in the sculpture decoration of the Parc de la Ciutadella. A friend and collaborator of architect Antoni Gaudí, Matamala collaborated with him in the decoration of the Sagrada Família and the Casa de los Botines.

His son Joan Matamala i Flotats was also a sculptor. He died in Barcelona in 1925.

1856 births
1925 deaths
People from Barcelona
Sculptors from Catalonia
20th-century Spanish sculptors
20th-century Spanish male artists
19th-century Spanish sculptors
19th-century Spanish male artists
Spanish male sculptors